Cathy Y. Yan is a Chinese-born American film director, screenwriter, and producer. Her films include the comedy-drama film Dead Pigs (2018) and Birds of Prey (2020), the eighth installment of the DC Extended Universe.

Early life and education
Yan was born in China and raised in Northern Virginia, near Washington, D.C. While her family was living in China, Yan's father was given a visa to study sociology in the U.S. Two years later her mother left for America, and Yan remained in China with her grandparents. At age four she was reunited with her parents in America.

As a child, Yan grew up with various creative outlets courtesy of her relatives and "deeply creative father". By age 8, Yan was the kid carrying around a video camera, eager to express herself through art and through dancing as a choreographer. She moved to Hong Kong when she was fourteen years old, where she attended high school.

She graduated with an A.B. from the Princeton School of Public and International Affairs at Princeton University in 2008 after completing an 133-page-long senior thesis, titled "Can the Mouse Byte the Paper Tiger? Internet-mediated Social Movements and Political Change in China", under the supervision of Lynn T. White. She later graduated in 2016 from New York University's MBA/MFA dual degree program, where she studied at both the Stern School of Business and the Tisch School of the Arts.

Career
Yan worked as a reporter for the Los Angeles Times and The Wall Street Journal in New York, Hong Kong and Beijing before turning to filmmaking.

After writing and directing several short films, Yan also shot a web-series and content for brands such as Armani, Subway, Spotify and The Innocence Project. By 2018, Yan made her feature debut with Dead Pigs. The film was inspired by the 2013 Huangpu River dead pigs incident, in which 16,000 dead pigs were found floating down the Huangpu River. Funded by Chinese investors, Yan shot the dark comedy in Shanghai with a bilingual crew then completed the film in New York; director Jia Zhangke executive produced. Dead Pigs premiered at the Sundance Film Festival and won a Special Jury Award for ensemble acting. Yan removed 12 minutes from the film in its wider February 2021 release on the streaming platform Mubi.

In April 2018, Yan was selected to direct the Harley Quinn DC Extended Universe superhero film Birds of Prey, based on the comic of the same name. The film was released on February 7, 2020 to positive reviews. Margot Robbie starred and co-produced and Christina Hodson wrote the script. Yan was the second woman and the first Asian woman to direct a DC film (or any US superhero film).

, Yan is working on directing and producing A24's film adaptation of Sour Heart, a collection of short stories by Jenny Zhang. Yan will co-write the script alongside Zhang for the autobiographical coming-of-age story about the immigrant experience of a young girl who moved from Shanghai to New York in the 90s.

In February 2021, Yan started developing an adaptation of Rachel Khong's short story, The Freshening. FilmNation Entertainment and Ali Wong were set to produce the feature, with Yan writing and directing.

In 2021, Yan directed an episode of the HBO drama series Succession called "The Disruption", in season three, episode three, for which she was nominated for the Primetime Emmy Award for Outstanding Directing for a Drama Series.

Styles and themes 
Yan's cinematic influences include Chen Kaige and Zhang Yimou. Since Yan's father was a big fan of the nineties era of Chinese cinema, Yan expanded into East Asian art-house cinema, which included Wong Kar-wai. Including American cinema, Yan appreciates the works of Robert Altman and Paul Thomas Anderson. Yan considers Dead Pigs as "a marriage of the American indie and classic Chinese indie tones she grew up with."

Personal life

Yan is married; her husband works in the restaurant industry. Both Yan and her husband are currently based in New York.

Filmography
Short film

Feature film

Television

Further reading 
Cathy Yan on Indie Wire

Cathy Yan on Princeton Alumni Weekly

Cathy Yan on The New York Times

References

External links

Cathy Yan at Film Grab
Cathy Yan at Mubi

Living people
American women film directors
American women film producers
American women screenwriters
Chinese women film directors
Chinese film producers
Chinese screenwriters
American film directors of Chinese descent
21st-century Chinese women writers
21st-century Chinese writers
21st-century American women writers
21st-century American screenwriters
1986 births